Nordreisa is a municipality in Troms og Finnmark county, Norway. The administrative centre of the municipality is the village of Storslett. Other villages include Oksfjordhamn, Sørkjosen, and Rotsund.

The municipality consists of the Reisadalen valley, with the river Reisaelva and deep pine forests, surrounded by mountains and high plateaus. Most people live in Storslett, where the river meets the Reisafjorden. Sørkjosen, just northwest of Storslett, is the location of Sørkjosen Airport with flights to Tromsø and several destinations in Finnmark. The European route E6 runs through the northern part of the municipality.

The  municipality is the 9th largest by area out of the 356 municipalities in Norway. Nordreisa is the 183rd most populous municipality in Norway with a population of 4,746.

General information
The municipality of Nordreisa was established on 1 January 1886 when Skjervøy Municipality was divided in two. The southern part of Skjervøy (population: 1,057) was separated to form the new municipality. On 1 January 1890, the Trætten and Loppevolden farms (population: 32) were transferred to Nordreisa from Skjervøy. The parts of Skjervøy lying on the mainland (population: 1,556) were transferred from Skjervøy to Nordreisa on 1 January 1972. On 1 January 1982, the southern part of the island of Uløya (population: 128) was transferred from Skjervøy to Nordreisa.

On 1 January 2020, the municipality became part of the newly formed Troms og Finnmark county. Previously, it had been part of the old Troms county.

Name
The municipality (originally the parish) is named after the local Reisafjorden. The fjord was named after the river Reisaelva which flows into the fjord. The river name is derived from the verb  which means "to raise" (referring to flooding). The prefix  (meaning "northern") was added to the name to distinguish the municipality from the nearby Sørreisa Municipality to the south. The municipal name was originally spelled Nordreisen, but the spelling was later changed to the present form.

Coat of arms
The coat of arms was granted on 21 December 1984. The official blazon is "Vert, two salmon haurient argent addorsed". This means the arms have a green field (background) and the charge is two salmon. The salmon have a tincture of argent which means they are commonly colored white, but if it is made out of metal, then silver is used. The salmon was chosen to be on the arms because the local Reisaelva river is one of Norway's best salmon fishing rivers. The arms were designed by Arvid Sveen.

Churches
The Church of Norway has one parish within the municipality of Nordreisa. It is part of the Nord-Troms prosti (deanery) in the Diocese of Nord-Hålogaland.

History
Most inhabitants are descendants of settlers from Finland who came over in the 18th century, escaping famine and war. Today, only a few old people can speak Finnish. Some inhabitants have Sami or Norwegian backgrounds, and today the Norwegian language is most commonly used.

Few old buildings survive in Nordreisa, as virtually everything was destroyed in early 1945 by retreating German troops. The upper, or southernmost, areas of the municipality are covered by the Reisa National Park with unique forest and high plateau vegetation.

In the 2007 municipal elections, Nordreisa recorded the highest vote for the right-wing Progress Party in Norway at 49.3%.

Government
All municipalities in Norway, including Nordreisa, are responsible for primary education (through 10th grade), outpatient health services, senior citizen services, unemployment and other social services, zoning, economic development, and municipal roads. The municipality is governed by a municipal council of elected representatives, which in turn elect a mayor.  The municipality falls under the Nord-Troms District Court and the Hålogaland Court of Appeal.

Municipal council
The municipal council  of Nordreisa is made up of 21 representatives that are elected to four year terms. The party breakdown of the council is as follows:

Mayors
The mayors of Nordreisa:

1886–1890: Peder Borch Lund (V)
1891–1892: Ole Martin Gausdal (V)
1893–1895: Johan Olai Bakkeslett 
1896–1898: Bertel Nilsen Sokkelvik 
1899–1901: Johan Olai Bakkeslett
1902–1904: Bertel Nilsen Sokkelvik
1905–1907: Olaus Johnsen Snemyr 
1908–1935: Leonhard Isachsen (Ap)
1935–1940: Lars Storslett (Ap)
1941–1942: Harald Lund Sørkjosen 
1943–1945: Sigurd Gjetmundsen Skogstad 
1945–1951: Håkon Henriksen (NKP)
1952–1955: Ove Myrland (Ap)
1956–1963: Arthur Elvestad (Ap)
1964–1969: Hjalmar Molund (Ap)
1970–1979: Arthur Elvestad (Ap)
1980–1991: Arne Pedersen (Ap)
1992–2003: Torbjørn Evanger (Ap)
2003–2011: John Karlsen (FrP)
2011–2015: Lidvart Jakobsen (Ap)
2015–2019: Øyvind Evanger (Ap)
2019–present: Hilde Anita Nyvoll (Ap)

Geography

Nordreisa Municipality is located around the Reisafjorden and the Reisadalen valley. The municipality also includes the southern part of the island of Uløya. The Lyngen fjord lies on the northwestern edge of the municipality. The island municipality of Skjervøy lies to the north; Kvænangen and Kautokeino municipalities are to the east; Finland is to the south; and the municipalities of Gáivuotna–Kåfjord and Lyngen to the west. The large mountain Halti lies in the southern part of the municipality, near Reisa National Park.

Climate
Nordreisa has a boreal climate, although with autumn as the wettest season. The wettest month, October, sees almost three times as much precipitation as the driest month, April. The all-time high  was recorded August 2018. The weather station near the small airport has been recording since 1974.

Notable people

 Anne Marie Blomstereng (born 1940 in Nordreisa) a Norwegian politician,  deputy mayor of Nordreisa from 1983 to 1995
 Ian Haugland (born 1964 in Storslett) the drummer in the Swedish rock band Europe 
 Thomas Braaten (born 1987 in Nordreisa) a football defender with over 300 club caps
 Ruben Kristiansen (born 1988 in Nordreisa) a Norwegian international footballer with over 200 club caps 
 Eirik Høgbakk, professional football player
 Bjørn Arne Olsen, actor in Titanic 
 Dag Rune Stangeland, Strongman

Gallery

References

External links

Municipal fact sheet from Statistics Norway 

 
Municipalities of Troms og Finnmark
Populated places of Arctic Norway
1886 establishments in Norway
Sámi-language municipalities